Hohman is a surname. Notable people with the surname include:

 Bill Hohman (1903–1968), an American professional baseball player
 Elmo Hohman (1894-1977), an American economics professor
 George Hohman (1932-2006), American politician, expelled from the Alaska Senate in 1982 following a bribery conviction
 John George Hohman (also known as Johann Georg Hohman(n)), a German-American printer
 Jon Hohman, American Football League player

See also
 Hohmann (disambiguation)